Errico Malatesta was an Italian anarchist and revolutionary socialist. Unless otherwise noted, all works are authored solely by Errico Malatesta.

Books

Articles

Letters

Collected Works 

 The Complete Works of Malatesta by AK Press

References 

Bibliographies of Italian writers
Philosophy bibliographies